Centropappus is a genus of flowering plants belonging to the family Asteraceae. It contains a single species, Centropappus brunonis.

Its native range is Tasmania.

References

Senecioneae
Monotypic Asteraceae genera